The Theban Tomb TT164 is located in Dra' Abu el-Naga', part of the Theban Necropolis, on the west bank of the Nile, opposite to Luxor.

TT164 is the burial place of the ancient Egyptian Intef, who was a scribe of recruits during the reign of Tuthmosis III in the Eighteenth Dynasty. Intef's time as a scribe of recruits may have overlapped with that of Tjanuny (TT74).

The tomb consists of a facade and a hall. Intef is depicted on the facade with a hymn. In the hall sons are shown bringing offerings to Intef and his wife. A stela with a hymn dedicated to Re-Harakhti was found. Intef is depicted spearing hippopotamus and in another scene he is shown fishing and fowling.

See also
 List of Theban tombs

References

Theban tombs
Buildings and structures of the Eighteenth Dynasty of Egypt